The Safford House is a historic home in Tarpon Springs, Florida. On October 16, 1974, it was added to the U.S. National Register of Historic Places.  The house is named for its original owner, Anson P.K. Safford.

The city of Tarpon Springs owns and operates the Safford House Museum as a late 19th-century Victorian historic house museum.

References
Sources
 Pinellas County listings at National Register of Historic Places
 Florida's Office of Cultural and Historical Programs
 Pinellas County listings
 Safford House
 Great Floridians of Tarpon Springs

Notes

External links
Safford House Museum - official site

Houses on the National Register of Historic Places in Florida
National Register of Historic Places in Pinellas County, Florida
Museums in Pinellas County, Florida
Historic house museums in Florida
Houses in Pinellas County, Florida
Buildings and structures in Tarpon Springs, Florida
1883 establishments in Florida
Houses completed in 1883